Staffordshire County Council elections are held every four years. Staffordshire County Council is the upper-tier authority for the non-metropolitan county of Staffordshire in England. Since the last boundary changes in 2013, 62 councillors have been elected from 60 electoral divisions.

Political control
Staffordshire County Council was first created in 1889. Its territory, powers and responsibilities were significantly reformed under the Local Government Act 1972, with a new council elected in 1973, initially acting as a shadow authority ahead of the new arrangements coming into effect on 1 April 1974. Since 1974, political control of the council has been held by the following parties:

Leadership
The leaders of the council since 1974 have been:

Council elections
2001 Staffordshire County Council election
2005 Staffordshire County Council election (new division boundaries)
2009 Staffordshire County Council election
2013 Staffordshire County Council election (new division boundaries)
2017 Staffordshire County Council election
2021 Staffordshire County Council election

County result maps

By-election results

1993-1997

1997-2001

2001-2005

2005-2009

References

External links
Staffordshire County Council

 
Council elections in Staffordshire
County council elections in England